Winnie Ngwenya is a South African politician, African National Congress (ANC) member and a permanent delegate to the National Council of Provinces since 2019. She is a member of the Gauteng provincial delegation in the legislature. Ngwenya served as a Member of the National Assembly from 2005 until 2014. Ngwenya has been mentioned at the ongoing State Capture inquiry.

Early life
Ngwenya was born in the Transvaal Province. She only completed grade 9. She later obtained certificates in management, international relations and leadership skills.

Political career
Ngwenya is a member of the ANC. She was appointed to the National Assembly, the lower house of parliament, in 2005. She served on the correctional services and transport committees. Ngwenya was re-elected to a second term in 2009 and left parliament in 2014. However, she returned to parliament in 2019, as a delegate to the National Council of Provinces, the upper house.

Ngwenya is a PEC member of the ANC in Gauteng and a member of the party's women's league.

State capture allegations
In February 2019, former ANC MP and current COPE spokesperson, Dennis Bloem, said in his testimony at The Judicial Commission of Inquiry into Allegations of State Capture that Ngwenya attempted to recruit him to do tasks for Bosasa. A few weeks earlier, former Bosasa COO Angelo Agrizzi revealed that Ngwenya and other ANC politicians had been receiving bribes of up to R20,000 from the company.

References

External links
Ms Winnie Ngwenya – People's Assembly

Living people
People from Gauteng
Members of the National Assembly of South Africa
Members of the National Council of Provinces
African National Congress politicians
21st-century South African politicians
21st-century South African women politicians
Women members of the National Assembly of South Africa
Women members of the National Council of Provinces
Year of birth missing (living people)